Safi N'Diaye (born June 16, 1988) is a French female rugby union player. She represented  at the 2014 Women's Rugby World Cup and was named to the Dream Team. She was also a member of the squad that won their fourth Six Nations title in 2014.

N'Diaye was named in France's fifteens team for the 2021 Rugby World Cup in New Zealand.

References

1988 births
Living people
French female rugby union players
French sportspeople of Senegalese descent